Arapuni is a rural town centre on the Waikato river in the South Waikato District of New Zealand. 
The town sits next to the Arapuni Dam, a hydroelectric dam  at Lake Arapuni commissioned in 1929. The Arapuni Power Station consists of eight turbines which give a total output of 196 MW, the largest of the power stations on the Waikato river. The Arapuni hydro station is owned and operated by Mercury Energy.

The New Zealand Ministry for Culture and Heritage gives a translation of "blocked path" for Arapuni.

The Arapuni Suspension Bridge below the dam is freely open to public.

The name Arapuni derives from Ara, meaning path and puni, meaning blocked or covered, and translates as blocked or covered path.

Marae

The local Pōhara Marae is a meeting ground of the Ngāti Raukawa hapū of Ngāti Korokī and Ngāti Mahuta, the Ngāti Korokī Kahukura hapū of Ngāti Hourua, and the Waikato Tainui hapū of Ngāti Korokī and Ngāti Raukawa ki Panehākua.

It features the Rangiātea meeting house.

In October 2020, the Government committed $2,584,751 from the Provincial Growth Fund to upgrade the marae and 5 other Waikato Tainui marae, creating 69 jobs.

Demographics
The settlement is part of the larger Putāruru Rural statistical area.

Arapuni had a population of 294 at the 2018 New Zealand census, an increase of 60 people (25.6%) since the 2013 census, and an increase of 60 people (25.6%) since the 2006 census. There were 129 households, comprising 132 males and 159 females, giving a sex ratio of 0.83 males per female, with 51 people (17.3%) aged under 15 years, 54 (18.4%) aged 15 to 29, 144 (49.0%) aged 30 to 64, and 48 (16.3%) aged 65 or older.

Ethnicities were 90.8% European/Pākehā, 19.4% Māori, 5.1% Pacific peoples, and 6.1% other ethnicities. People may identify with more than one ethnicity.

Although some people chose not to answer the census's question about religious affiliation, 57.1% had no religion, 26.5% were Christian, 1.0% had Māori religious beliefs, 1.0% were Buddhist and 4.1% had other religions.

Of those at least 15 years old, 39 (16.0%) people had a bachelor's or higher degree, and 54 (22.2%) people had no formal qualifications. 30 people (12.3%) earned over $70,000 compared to 17.2% nationally. The employment status of those at least 15 was that 111 (45.7%) people were employed full-time, 42 (17.3%) were part-time, and 12 (4.9%) were unemployed.

References

South Waikato District
Populated places in Waikato
Populated places on the Waikato River